A battery torque wrench is a battery-operated torque wrench that can apply a specified torque without effort from the operator.  It contains a planetary torque multiplier or a gearbox. A reaction device that  absorbs the torque rather than the tool operator. The torque output is adjusted by varying the voltage on the motor. The battery torque wrench is used to remove stubborn nuts, or to apply accurate torque. The gearboxes can have multiplication ratios up to 125:1. 

The battery torque wrench is sometimes confused with a standard impact wrench, due to their similar appearance. A battery torque wrench is driven by continuous gearing, and not by the hammers of an impacting wrench. A battery torque wrench has very little vibration, and excellent repeatability and accuracy.

The benefit of a battery torque wrench is its capability to operate independently of an outside power source, making them useful for applications that require work in tight spaces such as oil or gas pipelines. They also come with electronic features not found on pneumatic wrenches.

In addition, newer wrench models weigh much less than older battery-powered tools and feature an automatic release function which activates once torque is applied to the bolt. 

Meanwhile, advancements in battery technology have doubled the life of the batteries used in these wrenches. Newer battery-powered wrenches also allow for brushless motors, leading to a longer motor life. 

Torque capabilities of battery torque wrenches range from 115 Nm, up to a maximum of 8,100 Nm. (84 Ft lbs - 6000 Ft lbs)
The first large-capacity brushless battery torque wrench was invented in Germany in 2013.
Before the brushless motor with micro electronics was introduced, the battery torque wrench was not as accurate as it could be.
Because of the power limitations of the accurate motor, the tool has 2 speeds: one for speed, and one for power.

Battery requirements
A brushless battery motor using lithium-ion battery is the most common source of power for battery torque wrenches. The voltage required is designated by the amp hours of a battery. A complete battery with lower ampere hour must have higher voltage, and a physically larger size, to make up for loss of capacity, and vice versa. Manufacturing a battery motor that can handle higher-Ampere hour batteries are more costly, and the internal electronics are more complicated. The more complex the electronics, the more accurate the motor is when shutting off at a desired torque value. A very common battery combination would be compact 18 volt with a 5.0-ampere hour capacity. This combination varies by manufacturer.

Torque verification
Torque can be verified by a transducer mounted on the outside of the gearbox, connecting to the output shaft of the tool.
This transducer can wireless talk via Bluetooth to a mobile smartphone app.
This allows the creation of reports, to export incredibly accurate bolting data.
In addition, these battery torque wrenches come with a certificate of calibration.
The output of these tools can be adjusted by a potentiometer at the calibration facility.

See also
Torque multiplier
Electric torque wrench
Pneumatic torque wrench
Socket wrench
Torque wrench
Hydraulic torque wrench
Transducer

External links

Battery Torque Wrench Demonstration

Hand-held power tools
Wrenches